Wilhait is an unincorporated community in Albemarle County, Virginia.  There was a post village in Albemarle County named Wilhoit in existence in 1904.

References

Sources
 

Unincorporated communities in Virginia
Unincorporated communities in Albemarle County, Virginia